Francis Thomas Dingwall (1930 - 30 December 2019) was a 20th-century Scottish politician who served as Lord Provost of Glasgow 1995/96.

Life

He was born in Glasgow in 1930.

His working life was spent at Albion Motor Works in Scotstoun where he was shop steward. It later became part of British Leyland.

In February 1995 he defeated Bailie Alex Mosson in election of a new Labour leader in Glasgow, and
succeeded James Shields in the role of Lord Provost. His deputy in the period was Councillor Jimmy Mutter.

His period in office did not extend the normal two years but ended on 1 April 1996 due to redrawing of parliamentary boundaries on that date. He was succeeded as Lord Provost in 1996 by Pat Lally.

In 1998 Dingwall was one of the primary witnesses in the investigation of misconduct on the part of Pat Lally.

Family

He is married to Winifred. They have two children, Andrew (Drew) and Alison.

Artistic Recognition

He was portrayed in office by Brian McLaughlin.

References

1930 births
Living people
Lord Provosts of Glasgow
Scottish Labour councillors
Politicians from Glasgow